Nidhi is a Hindic feminine given name and a Thai masculine given name that may refer to the following notable people:

 Nidhhi Agerwal, Indian actress and dancer 
 Nidhi Bisht (born 1985), Indian casting director filmmaker, lawyer, actress and writer
Nidhi Buley (born 1986), Indian cricketer
 Nidhi Chanani (born 1980), Indian-American freelance illustrator and artist
Nidhi Eoseewong (born 1940), Thai historian, writer, and political commentator
 Nidhi Goyal (born 1985), Indian disability and gender rights activist
 Nidhi Jha, Indian actress 
 Nidhi Razdan (born 1977), Indian journalist, television personality and journalist
 Nidhi Subbaiah (born 1987), Indian film actress and model
 Nidhi Sunil (born 1987), Indian model and actress, and philanthropist 
 Nidhi Uttam, Indian television and film actress 
Nidhi Yasha (born 1983), Indian costume designer

Indian feminine given names
Thai masculine given names